HSG Nordhorn-Lingen (HSG Nordhorn until September 2008) is a handball club from Nordhorn, Germany. As of the season 2021/22 HSG Nordhorn-Lingen competes in the 2. Handball-Bundesliga.

In 2008 the club won the EHF Cup.

Crest, colours, supporters

Kits

External links

German handball clubs
Handball-Bundesliga
Handball clubs established in 1981
1981 establishments in Germany
Sport in Lower Saxony